Jim Little (born 1964) is a business executive and short lived CEO of the Ottawa Senators for 54 days in 2020.

Biography
Little was born in Montreal, Quebec, and has a bachelor's degree from McGill University. and began his career in Ottawa.

He was hired by the Ottawa Senators after Chief Operating Officer Nic Ruszkowski abruptly left and leaving owner Eugene Melnyk as acting CEO.

Prior to joining the Senators Little was EVP with Shaw Communications, as well as stints as an executive with Royal Bank of Canada (2008–2012), Bombardier Aerospace and Bell Canada.

References

1964 births
Anglophone Quebec people
Businesspeople from Montreal
Canadian chief executives
Ottawa Senators executives
Living people
McGill University alumni